Buffy the Vampire Slayer: Uninvited Guests is a trade paperback collecting comic stories based on the Buffy the Vampire Slayer television series.

Story description

Buffy battles Puritans, ice imps, hellhounds, and a demon.

Buffy the Vampire Slayer #4

Comic title: White Christmas 

As Sunnydale is suffering a puzzling heat wave, Buffy worries that she cannot afford a dress for an upcoming dance. She gets a job at the mall to fund her expenditures.

Buffy the Vampire Slayer #5

Comic title: Happy New Year 

A cursed Puritan arrives at the town as Sunnydale approaches the New Year.

Buffy the Vampire Slayer #6

Comic title: New Kid on the Block, part 1 

The girls organize a slumber party; Willow's new friend, Cynthia, volunteers to coordinate it. Xander does his best to crash the party.

Buffy the Vampire Slayer #7

Comic title: New Kid on the Block, part 2 

The slumber party has gone bad and trouble grows as the night continues. Cynthia might not have told the whole story.

Comics based on Buffy the Vampire Slayer